Mosby's Raiders may refer to:

 Mosby's Raiders (American Civil War)
 Mosby's Raiders (game)